Gordon Graydon Memorial Secondary School, "Gordon Graydon", "GGMSS", or simply "Graydon" for short, was a high school that served Grades 9 to 12 in Mississauga, Ontario, Canada. The school opened in 1957, and celebrated its 50th anniversary on May 26, 2007. It was named after Gordon Graydon, a Canadian politician who died in 1953. The school's slogan was "Palma Per Ardua": "Success through Hard Work".

Gordon Graydon was home to the International Business and Technology Program, the Graphic and Design Management Program, and the Specialist High Skills Major Program. The school was home of the only Graphic Design and Management Program in Ontario.

A report by school board staff proposed that the school be closed in June 2019.

On January 24, 2017, the Peel District School Boards Pupil Accommodation Review (PAR), voted in favour of the school closing in June 2018. In an effort to accommodate the students, Gordon Graydon's vocational and autism spectrum disorder (ASD) programs were relocated to Glenforest Secondary School for 2018-2019 school year. In addition, Graydon's graphic design and international business programs (GDM/IBT) were moved to T.L. Kennedy Secondary School for the 2018-2019 school year. Construction at both T.L. Kennedy and Glenforest secondary schools were needed to accommodate the incoming students. In December 2020 the Mississauga Continuing and Adult Education Centre moved into the former Gordon Graydon Memorial Secondary School building.

International, Business & Technology Program (IBT)
The International, Business and Technology (IBT) program is a regional program in the Peel District School Board that extends the secondary school curriculum. The IBT Program is also offered at North Park Secondary School and Meadowvale Secondary School.

Gordon Graydon M.S.S. also had a Regional program, Vocational One, Two and ASD (Autistic Spectrum Disorder) programs.  Students enrolled in these programs, are provided extra support in their academics and social/emotional exceptionalities.

School traditions

Grade Nine Olympics: A day to welcome the new Grade Nine students. The event occurred at the end of September and ran by senior students in the Student Athletic Association (SAA).
School Musical: Theatre Graydon presented a school musical every year. Past performances include High School Musical, Beauty and The Beast, Rent, Blood Brothers, West Side Story, Footloose, Seussical the Musical and In the Heights.

Athletics
Gordon Graydon had many athletic teams, including the following sports: basketball, tennis, archery, badminton, swimming, field hockey, volleyball, soccer, rugby union, baseball, softball, and many more. An athletic banquet is held each year to celebrate accomplishments in athletics.

Teams
Archery
Badminton
Ball Hockey
Baseball 
Basketball (Bantam Boys/Junior Boys/Senior Boys/Varsity Girls)
Cricket (Varsity Boys)
Cross Country
Hockey (Ice hockey (Boys), Field (Girls))
Soccer (Varsity Girls/Varsity Boys)
Swimming
Tennis (Junior/Senior)
Table Tennis Team
Ultimate Frisbee 
Volleyball (Junior Boys/Girls, Senior Boys/Girls)

Notable alumni
 Deborah Chow, filmmaker, director, screenwriter
 Rodrigo Leal, actor, model

See also
List of high schools in Ontario

External links

References

Peel District School Board
High schools in Mississauga
Educational institutions established in 1956
Educational institutions disestablished in 2018
1956 establishments in Ontario
2018 disestablishments in Ontario